Veneman is a Dutch surname. Notable people with the surname include:

 Ann Veneman (born 1949), American lawyer
 Barry Veneman (born 1972), Dutch motorcycle racer
 John Veneman (1925–1982), American politician

See also
 Venema

Dutch-language surnames